Discordipinna is a genus of gobies native to the Indian Ocean and the western Pacific Ocean.

Species
There are currently two recognized species in this genus:
 Discordipinna filamentosa I. S. Chen, T. Suzuki & K. T. Shao, 2012
 Discordipinna griessingeri Hoese & Fourmanoir, 1978 (Spikefin goby)

References
Paying Images of Discordipinna 

https://www.shutterstock.com/search/Discordipinna+griessingeri

https://depositphotos.com/stock-photos/discordipinna-griessingeri.html

https://www.alamy.com/search/imageresults.aspx?imgt=0&qt=discordipinna+griessingeri

https://stock.adobe.com/search?load_type=search&native_visual_search=&similar_content_id=&is_recent_search=&search_type=usertyped&k=Discordipinna+griessingeri

Gobiidae